The 2017–18 Melbourne Stars season was the seventh in the club's history. Coached by Stephen Fleming and captained by John Hastings, they competed in the BBL's 2017–18 season.

Season

Ladder

Regular season

Players

Season statistics

Home attendance

References

External links
 Official website of the Melbourne Stars
 Official website of the Big Bash League

Melbourne Stars seasons